Praid  is a commune in Harghita County, Romania. It lies in the Székely Land, an ethno-cultural region in eastern Transylvania, and is composed of six villages:

Demographics
The commune has an absolute Hungarian (Székely) majority. According to the 2011 census it has a population of 6,502, of which 91.68% are Hungarian and 2.65% Roma. The 2002 Census reported 69.36% of the total population belonging to the Protestant Hungarian Reformed Church, while Roman Catholicism is professed by 22.46% of the respondents.

Natives
Vilmos Nagy de Nagybaczon (1884–1976), commanding general of the Royal Hungarian Army

Tourism

The commune's chief economic activity centers around the Praid salt mine that provides salt for both industrial and gastronomical use and attracts over 400,000 tourists every year.

See also
Dacian fortress of Praid

External links
www.parajd.lap.hu 
Salt mine official site

References

Communes in Harghita County
Localities in Transylvania
Székely communities
Mining communities in Romania